City Across the River is a 1949 American film noir crime film directed by Maxwell Shane and starring Stephen McNally, Thelma Ritter, Sue England, Barbara Whiting, Luis Van Rooten and Jeff Corey. The screenplay is based on the novel The Amboy Dukes by Irving Shulman.

The film is the credited screen debut of Tony Curtis (billed onscreen as "Anthony Curtis").

Plot
Two members of a tough Brooklyn street gang accidentally kill one of their teachers.

Frank Cusack is a leading member of the Amboy Dukes teenage gang based in a slum-ridden area of Brooklyn. His activities with the gang ultimately lead from vandalism and hooliganism to complicity in the murder of a school teacher. His hopes—and those of his parents—for an escape from the bleakness of slum life are dashed by circumstance and by his willingness to accept the gang code of not informing to the police.

Summary
The film possibly makes a more convincing impact due to its lack of big stars. The roles are filled mainly by unrecognizable or relatively new actors. Most importantly, the film emphasizes the terrible consequences for the parents and sister of the son - sixteen year old Frank - who engages in acts which are initially thoughtless and finally criminal.

The parents, especially the mother (Thelma Ritter), are shown as decent, thoughtful working-class people. They devote their efforts, giving up personal dreams in the process, to provide for their children as best they can. They emphasize ideals and behavior that will enable Frank and his sister to rise out of the tenements. It is tragic irony that these efforts mean that neither parent is able to be home very often, so Frank is largely unsupervised and lacks consistent guidance.

Although the film does suggest that lack of parental supervision is a reason for juvenile delinquency, it squarely pins the blame on living conditions as the chief cause: squalid and unhygienic surroundings, run-down tenements, cramped living space, overcrowding. The moods of frustration and hopelessness created by such an environment, the movie insists, are also prime contributors to juvenile delinquency. City Across the River highlights Frank's parents' contention that a good education for their children is the best way to lift the next generation from a sordid and dangerous environment.

Cast
 Stephen McNally as Stan Albert
 Thelma Ritter as Mrs. Katie Cusack
 Luis Van Rooten as Joe Cusack
 Jeff Corey as Police Lieutenant Louie Macon
 Sharon McManus as Alice Cusack
 Sue England as Betty Maylor
 Barbara Whiting as Annie Kane
 Richard Benedict as Gaggsy Steens
 Peter Fernandez as Frank Cusack
 Al Ramsen as Benjamin 'Benny' Wilks
 Joshua Shelley as Theodore "Crazy" Perrin
 Tony Curtis as Mitch (as Anthony Curtis)
 Pepe Hern - as Pete
 Mickey Knox as Larry
 Richard Jaeckel as Bull
 Robert Osterloh as Mr. Bannon

Reception

Box office
The film opened at the Capitol Theatre in New York City in the week of April 7, 1949 and grossed $72,000 in its opening week.

Critical response
Thomas M. Pryor, film critic for the New York Times, gave the film a positive review: "Despite its limited view, City Across the River is nevertheless an honest and tempered reflection of life. It is rich in character delineation, especially in minor roles, and there is a coarse, natural tang to much of the writing by Director-Producer Maxwell Shane and his co-scenarist, Dennis Cooper. Most of the players are comparatively unfamiliar, with the exception of Stephen McNally, who plays the role of a community center director in the neighborhood, and this gives the film an added degree of realism."

Variety magazine praised the film: "Out of Irving Shulman’s grim novel, The Amboy Dukes, Maxwell Shane has whipped together a hardhitting and honest film on juvenile delinquency ... The plot threads are smoothly woven into the social fabric ... The performances by all members of the cast are marked by Shane's accent on naturalness."

Film critic Dennis Schwartz questioned the honesty of the screenplay: "This is a much softened version of Irving Schulman's The Amboy Dukes, a book about a rough gang of teenagers in the postwar [sic] period of Brooklyn ... This is a tired and clichéd film with its main selling point all the good location shots of the city. Tony Curtis made his film debut, taking a small part as one of the Amboy Dukes. All the gang members are stock characters and the predictable story sheds little insight about juvenile delinquency, offering only an outsider's look into the grimness of street life ... This film missed what teenage life was like in the city slums by a country mile and instead threw together a cliché-ridden story. The book was a popular hard-hitting novel. This film lost everything about the novel that was essential, and the robotic acting didn't help."

References

External links
 
 
 
 
 
 

1949 crime films
1949 films
American crime films
American black-and-white films
Film noir
Films based on American novels
Films directed by Maxwell Shane
Films scored by Walter Scharf
Films set in Brooklyn
Universal Pictures films
1940s English-language films
1940s American films